Morten Lund may refer to:

 Morten Lund (musician), Danish jazz drummer
 Morten Lund (investor), Danish venture capitalist
 Morten Lund (politician), Norwegian politician

See also
 Lund (disambiguation)